Real Murcia Club de Fútbol "B", also known as Real Murcia Imperial is a spanish football team based in Murcia, in the namesake community. Founded in 1922, it is the reserve team of Real Murcia and plays in Tercera División – Group 13, holding home games at Campus Universitario, with a 3,000-seat capacity.

Club names
As farm team:
Imperial de Murcia Fútbol Club (1922–40)
Imperial de Murcia Club de Fútbol (1940–93)
As reserve team:
Real Murcia Club de Fútbol B (1993–present)

Season to season
As farm team

As reserve team

1 season in Segunda División
2 seasons in Segunda División B
67 seasons in Tercera División

Honours
Tercera División: 2006–07

References

External links
Real Murcia official website 
Futbolme team profile 

Real Murcia
Spanish reserve football teams
Football clubs in the Region of Murcia
Association football clubs established in 1922
1922 establishments in Spain
Segunda División clubs